Johann Sebastian Bach composed the church cantata  (Heart and mouth and deed and life), 147 in 1723 during his first year as Thomaskantor, the director of church music in Leipzig. His cantata is part of his first cantata cycle there and was written for the Marian feast of the Visitation on 2 July, which commemorates Mary's visit to Elizabeth as narrated in the Gospel of Luke in the prescribed reading for the feast day. Bach based the music on his earlier cantata BWV 147a, written originally in Weimar in 1716 for Advent. He expanded the Advent cantata in six movements to ten movements in two parts in the new work. While the text of the Advent cantata was written by the Weimar court poet Salomo Franck, the librettist of the adapted version who added several recitatives is anonymous.

Bach began the cantata with a chorus for the full orchestra, followed by alternating recitatives and arias with often obbligato instrument. He scored it for four vocal soloists, a four-part choir, and a Baroque instrumental ensemble of trumpet, two oboes, strings, and continuo. The closing chorale of the earlier work was replaced by the hymn "" (1661) by Martin Janus, while using the melody of "" by Johann Schop. Two of its stanzas close the two parts of the cantata in an identical setting. While Bach often composed four-part chorales to end a cantata, he embedded such a setting here in a pastoral instrumental concerto. This music became famous in a piano transcription by Dame Myra Hess as Jesu, Joy of Man's Desiring.

History and words 
Bach took office as Thomaskantor, the music director in Leipzig, end of May 1723. It was part of his duties to supply music for the Sundays and feast days of the liturgical year at four churches of the town, and he decided to compose new cantatas for these occasions. He began with a cantata for the first Sunday after Trinity in 1723, performed on 30 May, and wrote a series of church cantatas until Trinity of the next year, which became known as his first cantata cycle. Some cantatas of that cycle were based on music he had composed before, including , presented as the sixth cantata of the cycle.

The Visitation was among the Marian feasts celebrated in Lutheran Germany (additional cantatas for the occasion survive, from both Bach and other composers), and was the setting for which Bach composed . Bach used as a basis for the music a cantata in six movements that he had written in Weimar for the fourth Sunday in Advent 1716, Herz und Mund und Tat und Leben, BWV 147a. As Leipzig observed tempus clausum (time of silence) during Advent, allowing cantata music only on the first Sunday, Bach could not perform the cantata for the same occasion in Leipzig, but adapted it for the feast of the Visitation.

The Advent cantata text was written by the Weimar court poet, librarian and numismatist, Salomo Franck, who published it in his 1717 collection Evangelische Sonn- und Festtages-Andachten. He wrote four arias in a row, focused on the Advent message of "repentance, faith, preparation and conversion", in the words of John Eliot Gardiner who conducted the Bach Cantata Pilgrimage in 2000.

The text for Advent was also suitable for a feast celebrating Mary in general. An anonymous librettist adapted the text for the different occasion, mainly by adding three recitatives that clarify the relation to Visitation. He made references to the gospel reading, for example mentioning in the fourth movement, as in verse 52 of the gospel, that "the arm of the Most High thrusts the mighty from their seat and exults the lowly, and in the eighth movement, as in verse 41, that the unborn child leaps in its mother's womb. The order of the arias was changed, their text changed mostly slightly but rewritten for the last aria, and the closing chorale was replaced by the 1661 hymn "" (Jesus, my soul's delight) by Martin Janus (or Jahn). Its stanzas 6 and 17 were selected to conclude the two parts of the new cantata which were performed before and after the sermon. They express a commitment of the believer, speaking in the first person, to hold Jesus as a high treasure.

Music

Structure and scoring 
Bach structured the cantata in ten movements, in two parts of six and four movements, respectively. The first movement is scored for choir and the full orchestra. The inner movements are alternating recitatives and arias for solo singers and mostly obbligato instruments. Both parts are concluded with a chorale stanza, both from the same hymn and set the same way. Bach scored the work for four vocal soloists (soprano (S), alto (A), tenor (T) and bass (B)), a four-part choir, and a Baroque instrumental ensemble: trumpet (Tr), two oboes (Ob)  (oboe d'amore (Oa), oboe da caccia (Oc)), two violins (Vl), viola (Va), and basso continuo (Bc) including bassoon (Fg).

In the following table of the movements, the first columns shows the movement number, and in brackets the movement number of the Weimar cantata. The scoring follows the Neue Bach-Ausgabe. The keys and time signatures are taken from the book by Bach scholar Alfred Dürr, using the symbol for common time (4/4). The instruments are shown separately for winds and strings, while the continuo, playing throughout, is not shown.

Movements 
A complex choral movement is taken from the Advent cantata. The three new recitatives are scored differently, the first as an accompagnato with chords of the strings, the second secco accompanied only by the continuo, the third as another accompagnato, with oboes. Three of the arias from the original cantata are scored for voice and solo instruments or only continuo, whereas the last aria, speaking of the miracles of Jesus, is accompanied by the full orchestra.

1 
The opening chorus, "" (Heart and mouth and deed and life), renders the complete words in three sections, the third one a reprise of the first one and even the middle section not too different in character  it is thus not quite in the traditional da capo form. The piece begins with an instrumental ritornello, with trumpet and oboes combining to give a solemn opening fanfare. The first section begins with an animated fugal exposition with colla parte instruments. The fugue subject stresses the word  (life) by a melisma extended over three measures. The soprano starts the theme, the alto enters just one measure later, tenor after two more measures, bass one measure later, the fast succession resulting in a lively music as a good image of life. This quick passage, is followed by a purely vocal passage, sustained only by the continuo, on the words "ohne Furcht und Heuchelei". The central section is introduced by the initial ritornello, which brings an alternance of contrapuntal and harmonic phrases, before a return of the slightly varied riternello. The final section features the same pattern of entrances as the first, but building from the lowest voice to the highest. The chorus concludes with a final repetition of the riternello.

2 
The first recitative for tenor, "" (Blessed mouth! Mary makes the inmost part of her soul known through thanks and praise), introduces the tender and emotive environment which characterises the work after the opening festive flourish. It is accompanied by chords from the strings. French musicologist Gilles Cantagrel describes the recitative as having a character "tenderly evoking the Virgin singing the Magnificat".

3 
The first aria, "" (Do not be ashamed, o soul, to acknowledge your Savior), is scored as a trio for the oboe d'amore, alto and continuo, in an overall very expressive air that has characteristics of an intimate meditation. The initial ritornello already features a hesitant rhythm, with syncopations and hemiolas taking away from the piece's regularity: combined with the use of the alto voice (usually associated with fear or doubt), this suggests an attempt to translate into music the doubts which beset the Christian soul.

4 
The second recitative is for bass, a secco accompanied only by the continuo. "" (Astonishment might dazzle the mighty, until the arm of the Highest throws them), relates to the Deposuit potentes verse from the Magnificat. This is illustrated through the intervention of the continuo, which translates the text into large ascending and descending movements.

5 
The second aria, "" (Prepare, Jesus, even now the path for Yourself,), was the third in the Advent cantata. Scored as a trio, the solo violin expresses confidence in divine mercy through triplets punctuated by the continuo. The soprano occasionally soars above, giving a serene and gracious feeling to a movement which otherwise appears quite simple.

6 

The chorale ending Part I is the sixth stanza from the hymn, setting a melody by Johann Schop, "", which Bach also used in his St Matthew Passion for the words "". The simple four-part choral part is embedded in a setting of the full orchestra dominated by a motive in pastoral triplets derived from the first line of the chorale melody.

Gardiner calls this music of "mellifluous beauty and apparent naturalness", and points out that it is nonetheless derived from the hymn tune.

7 
The third aria was the second in the Advent cantata. The tenor, accompanied only by the continuo, sings a prayer for help: "" (Help, Jesus, help that I may also acknowledge You in prosperity and in woe, in joy and in sorrow). The initial motive is repeated throughout the air, music serving to remind the associated text. The active continuo supports the vocal line, which expresses the textual call for help with striking confidence in a simple and conjunct melody.

8 
The third recitative is for alto:  (The wondrous hand of the exalted Almighty is active in the mysteries of the earth). It is accompanied by two oboes da caccia which add a continuous expressive motive, interrupted only when the child's leaping in the womb is mentioned which they illustrate. Gardiner mentions that it forebodes recitatives of the later great Passions. The text is inspired by the first two lines of the Magnificat.

9 
The last aria speaks of proclaiming the miracles of Jesus. The bass is accompanied by the full orchestra: "" (I will sing of Jesus' wonders and bring my lip's offering to Him), expressing the wonders of faith with trumpet, oboes and strings giving a jubilatory tone which appears as a response to the initial chorus, with the bass adding virtuoso embellishments on "Opfer" and "Feuer", answering the continuo.

10 

The chorale concluding Part II is the same music as for Part I, setting the 17th stanza, "" (Jesus shall remain my joy, my heart's comfort and sap).

The music of the chorale movements is now best known for the piano transcription by Dame Myra Hess of Hugh P. Allen's choral version of Bach's arrangement, and is notable under the title Jesu, Joy of Man's Desiring, an inexact translation which transforms the original affirmation ("Jesus remains my joy") into a wish.

Recordings 
In the following table of recordings, instrumental groups playing period instruments in historically informed performances are highlighted by a green background.

References

Cited sources

External links 
 Herz und Mund und Tat und Leben, BWV 147: performance by the Netherlands Bach Society (video and background information)
 
 Cantata BWV 147 Herz und Mund und Tat und Leben history, scoring, sources for text and music, translations to various languages, discography, discussion on Bach Cantatas Website
 Chapter 8 BWV 147 Herz und Mund und Tat und Leben / Heart and mouth, action and life. Julian Mincham, 2010
 BWV 147.6=147.10 bach-chorales.com

Church cantatas by Johann Sebastian Bach
1723 compositions